VA-20 has the following meanings:
Attack Squadron 20 (U.S. Navy)
State Route 20 (Virginia)

VA-20 (Valladolid), a highway in Spain